The 1988 United States presidential election in Indiana took place on November 8, 1988. All 50 states and the District of Columbia were part of the election. State voters chose twelve electors to the Electoral College, which selected the president and vice president of the United States.

Indiana voters chose George H. W. Bush over Michael Dukakis by a 20-point margin. It is the home state of Bush's running mate Dan Quayle. No Democratic candidate has won the state since 1964, with the exception of Barack Obama, who went on to win it in 2008.

Results

Results by county

See also
 United States presidential elections in Indiana

References

1988
1988 Indiana elections
Indiana